Thanakorn Saipanya (born 5 April 1993) is a Thai footballer who plays as a defender, and was captain in the 2012 AFC U-19 Championship.

Honours

International
Thailand U-19
 AFF U-19 Youth Championship Champions (1); 2011

References 

1993 births
Living people
Thanakorn Saipunya
Association football central defenders
Thanakorn Saipunya
Thanakorn Saipunya
Thanakorn Saipunya
Thanakorn Saipunya
Thanakorn Saipunya
Thanakorn Saipunya
Thanakorn Saipunya
Thanakorn Saipunya
Thanakorn Saipunya